The 1924 College Football All-America team is composed of college football players who were selected as All-Americans by various organizations and writers that chose College Football All-America Teams in 1924. The six selectors recognized by the NCAA as "official" for the 1924 season are (1) Walter Camp, whose selections were published in Collier's Weekly, (2) Football World magazine (FW), (3) the All-America Board (AAB), (4) the International News Service (INS), (5) Liberty magazine, and (6) the Newspaper Enterprise Association (NEA).

The only unanimous All-American in 1924 was halfback Red Grange of Illinois, known as "The Galloping Ghost" and who in 2008 was named by ESPN as the best college football player of all time.  The consensus All-Americans recognized by the NCAA for 1924 also include tackle Ed Weir, who was later named the 19th best athlete in Nebraska history, and three of Notre Dame's legendary Four Horseman (halfback Jim Crowley, quarterback Harry Stuhldreher, and fullback Elmer Layden).

Consensus All-Americans
For the year 1924, the NCAA recognizes six All-American teams as "official" designations for purposes of its consensus determinations. The following chart identifies the NCAA-recognized consensus All-Americans and displays which first-team designations they received.

All-Americans of 1924

Ends

Jim Lawson, Stanford (WC-2; AAB; FW; ASM-1; NEA; BE-1; DW-2; WE-2)
Richard Luman, Yale (AAB; INS; LP-1; BE-2; DW-1; WE-1)
Henry "Hek" Wakefield, Vanderbilt (WC-2; INS; NEA; LP-1; BE-1; NB-1; DW-1; WE-3; BC)
Charlie Berry, Lafayette (WC-1; ASM-2; DW-3)
Henry Bjorkman, Dartmouth (WC-1; ASM-2; LIB; NB-2; WE-1)
Clark Craig, Penn (NB-1)
Edmond Stout, Princeton (FW; ASM-1)
Hilary Mahaney, Holy Cross (WC-3; LIB; FW; BE-2; DW-2; WE-2)
Lowell Otte, Iowa (LP-2; DW-3; WE-3)
Cal Hubbard, Centenary (College and Pro Football Hall of Fame) (LP-2)
Frank Frazer, Army (WC-3)
Steve Pulaski, Wisconsin (NB-2)
Frank Rokusek, Illinois (NB-3; BC)
Shep Bingham, Yale (NB-3)
Frank Henderson, Cornell (ASM-3)
Clarence Muhl, Illinois (ASM-3)

Tackles

Ed Weir, Nebraska (College Football Hall of Fame) (WC-1; AAB; FW; ASM-1; INS; LIB; LP-2; BE-2; NB-1; DW-1; WE-1; BC)
Ed McGinley, Penn (College Football Hall of Fame) (WC-1; AAB; INS; NEA; BE-1; DW-1; WE-2)
Bob Beattie, Princeton (WC-2; NEA; BE-1; NB-2; DW-2; WE-1)
Frank Gowdy, Chicago (WC-3; FW; ASM-1; LIB; LP-1; DW-2; WE-2)
Johnny Joss, Yale (LP-1)
Mordecai Starobin, Syracuse (NB-1)
Tom Edwards, Michigan (LP-2)
John W. Hancock, Iowa (ASM-2; BE-2; NB-2; BC)
Pappy Waldorf, Syracuse (College Football Hall of Fame) (WC-2)
Zeke Wissinger, Pittsburgh (WC-3)
Jim Taylor, Georgia (NB-3)
Jules Prevost, Penn State (ASM-2; NB-3)
Norman Anderson, So. California (ASM-2; DW-3; WE-3)
Joe Bach, Notre Dame (DW-3)
Tex Cox, Minnesota (ASM-3)
Charles Van Dyne, Missouri (WE-3)

Guards
Carl Diehl, Dartmouth (INS; LIB; NEA; BE-1; DW-1; NB-1; WE-3)
Joe Pondelik, Chicago (WC-2; AAB; INS; ASM-2; LIB; LP-1; DW-1; WE-1)
Edliff Slaughter, Michigan (WC-1; LP-1; BE-2; NB-1; BC)
August W. Farwick, Army (AAB; NEA; ASM-2; BE-1; NB-2; DW-2; WE-1)
Alton Papworth, Penn (FW; ASM-1)
Walter Mahan, West Virginia (WC-3; BE-2)
Herbert Sturhahn, Yale (College Football Hall of Fame) (DW-2)
Howard, Princeton (LP-2)
Charles Parsons, Northwestern (LP-2; WE-3)
George Abramson, Minnesota (WC-2; NB-2; WE-2; BC)
Bill Fleckenstein, Iowa (WC-3)
Bill Buckler, Alabama (NB-3)
William House, Penn State (NB-3)
Walt Godwin, Georgia Tech (DW-3)
Harry Ellinger, Army (DW-3)
Ralph Hills, Princeton (ASM-2)
Adolph Bieberstein, Wisconsin (ASM-3)

Centers
Edwin C. Horrell, California (College Football Hall of Fame) (WC-1 [g]; INS; ASM-3; LIB; NEA; BE-1; DW-1; WE-1)
Adam Walsh, Notre Dame (College Football Hall of Fame) (WC-3; LP-1; ASM-2; BE-2; NB-2; DW-2; WE-2; BC)
Edgar Garbisch, Army (College Football Hall of Fame) (WC-1; FW; ASM-1 [g]; NB-3; DW-3; WE-2 [g])
Winslow Lovejoy, Yale (WC-2; AAB; FW; ASM-1; NB-1; WE-3)
Shorty Propst, Alabama (LP-2)

Quarterbacks
Harry Stuhldreher, Notre Dame (College Football Hall of Fame) (WC-1; AAB; INS; ASM-2; LIB; NEA; LP-1; BE-1; NB-1; DW-1; WE-1)
Eddie Dooley, Dartmouth (FW; ASM-1; BE-2; DW-2; WE-2)
Charles Darling, Boston College (LIB [hb]; NB-2)
Tod Rockwell, Michigan (BC)
Leland Parkin, Iowa (LP-2; NB-3; WE-3)
Jacob Slagle, Princeton (WC-2)
Skippy Stivers, Idaho (WC-3)
Al Bloodgood, Nebraska (ASM-3)
Herb Covington, Centre (DW-3)

Halfbacks
Red Grange, Illinois (College Football Hall of Fame) (WC-1; AAB; FW; ASM-1; INS; LIB; NEA; LP-1 [fb]; BE-1; NB-1; DW-1; WE-1; BC)
Bob Red Hall, Dartmouth (Liberty- LH behind Red Grange)
Jim Crowley, Notre Dame (College Football Hall of Fame) (WC-2 [fb]; AAB; FW; ASM-1; INS; NEA; BE-1; NB-1; DW-1; WE-1; BC)
Walter Koppisch, Columbia (College Football Hall of Fame) (WC-1; BE-2; NB-2; DW-2)
Ralph Baker, Northwestern (LP-1; BE-2; NB-3; DW-2; WE-2)
Ducky Pond, Yale (WC-2; NEA; ASM-2; NB-2; DW-3; WE-3; BE-1 [FB])
Don Miller, Notre Dame (College Football Hall of Fame) (DW-3)
Clarence Schutte, Minnesota (LP-2)
Wildcat Wilson, Washington (WC-2)
Heinie Benkert, Rutgers (ASM-2)
Herb Steger, Michigan (ASM-3)
Harry Wilson, Army (ASM-3)
Tut Imlay, California (WC-3)
Jackson Keefer, Brown (WC-3)
Gil Reese, Vanderbilt (NB-3)
Hust Stockton, Gonzaga (WE-2)
Rudolph Bahr, Purdue (WE-3)

Fullbacks
Elmer Layden, Notre Dame (College Football Hall of Fame) (AAB; INS; LIB; LP-2 [hb]; NB-1; DW-1; WE-1)
Homer Hazel, Rutgers (College Football Hall of Fame) (WC-1; FW; ASM-1; NB-3; BC)
Doug Wycoff, Georgia Tech (ASM-3; LP-1 [hb]; NB-2; DW-2; WE-3)
Jack McBride, Syracuse (BE-2; DW-3; WE-2)
John Webster Thomas, Chicago (LP-2)
Red Strader, St. Mary's (WC-3)
Austin "Five Yards" McCarty, Chicago (ASM-2)

Key
NCAA recognized selectors for 1924
 WC = Collier's Weekly as selected by Walter Camp
 AAB = All-America Board
 FW = Football World magazine
 INS = International News Service
 LIB = Liberty magazine
 NEA = Newspaper Editors Association

Other selectors
 ASM = All-Sports Magazine, selected from a combined vote of 312 prominent football coaches, officials and sport writers in all sections of the country, "representing the opinions of the best informed critics in all parts of the country, appear in the December number of All-Sports Magazine."
 NB = Norman E. Brown
 LP = Lawrence Perry
 BE = Billy Evans
 DW = Davis J. Walsh, sports editor of the International News Service
 WE = Walter Eckersall for the Chicago Tribune
 BC = Bruno Crenna

Bold = Consensus All-American
 1 – First-team selection
 2 – Second-team selection
 3 – Third-team selection

See also
 1924 All-Big Ten Conference football team
 1924 All-Pacific Coast football team
 1924 All-Southern college football team

References

All-America Team
College Football All-America Teams